Berlin Alexanderplatz is a 1929 novel by Alfred Döblin. It is considered one of the most important and innovative works of the Weimar Republic.  In a 2002 poll of 100 noted writers the book was named among the top 100 books of all time.

Summary
The story concerns a murderer, Franz Biberkopf, fresh from prison. When his friend murders the prostitute on whom Biberkopf has been relying as an anchor, he realizes that he will be unable to extricate himself from the underworld into which he has sunk. He must deal with misery, lack of opportunities, crime and the imminent ascendency of Nazism. During his struggle to survive against all odds, life rewards him with an unsuspected surprise but his happiness will not last as the story continues.

Focus and narrative technique
The novel is set in the working-class district near Alexanderplatz in 1920s Berlin. Although its narrative style is sometimes compared to that of James Joyce's, critics such as Walter Benjamin have drawn a distinction between Ulysses’ interior monologue and Berlin Alexanderplatz'''s use of montage. Oliver Kamm, writing  in the London Times, says Döblin's methods are more akin to Kafka in his use of "erlebte Rede (roughly, experienced speech — a blending of first-person and third-person narrative)". The novel is told from multiple points of view, and uses sound effects, newspaper articles, songs, speeches, and other books to propel the plot.

Translations
The novel was translated into English in 1931 by Eugene Jolas, a friend of James Joyce. The translation was not well received; it particularly was criticised for the way in which it rendered everyday working-class speech. A 2018 English translation by Michael Hofmann, published by New York Review Books, was given a starred review from Kirkus Reviews, which called it "vigorous and fresh" and a "welcome refurbishing of a masterpiece of literary modernism". According to Oliver Kamm, "Dialogue is the most difficult thing to get right in translation" which Hofmann has rendered "in cockney dialect. It reads fluently, even at the risk of being possibly obscure to a non-British audience".

Film adaptations

The novel has been adapted three times for film. In 1931 Berlin-Alexanderplatz  was directed by Piel Jutzi. Döblin worked on the adaptation, along with Karlheinz Martin and Hans Wilhelm. The film starred Heinrich George, Maria Bard, Margarete Schlegel, Bernhard Minetti, Gerhard Bienert, Albert Florath and Paul Westermeier.

The second adaptation, Berlin Alexanderplatz, was directed by Rainer Werner Fassbinder. Produced for and shown on German television in 1980 as a 14-part miniseries, it also has been shown theatrically. It runs for 15 hours (NTSC and film releases expand the runtime by a half hour). Upon its release in New York City, ticket holders were required to come to the theatre for three consecutive nights to see the entire film.

Both films were released in November 2007 by the Criterion Collection in the US in a multi-disc DVD. A Region 2 edition of the Fassbinder version was released in the UK by Second Sight in October that year.

Burhan Qurbani directed the most recent film adaptation, Berlin Alexanderplatz, which premiered at the 70th Berlin International Film Festival in 2020. Qurbani's version recontextualised the lead role of Franz as Francis, an Afro-German refugee from Guinea-Bissau.

See also
List of fiction set in Berlin
Museum of Modern Literature, where the original manuscript is held
Best German Novels of the Twentieth Century

 References 

Bibliography

 
 
 
 

Further reading

 Dollenmayer, David B. The Berlin Novels of Alfred Döblin: Wadzek's Battle with the Steam Turbine, Berlin Alexanderplatz, Men Without Mercy, and November 1918.'' Berkeley: University of California Press, 1988. Print.
 
 
 
 
 Slugan, Mario. 2017. Montage as Perceptual Experience: Berlin Alexanderplatz from Döblin to Fassbinder. Rochester: Boydell & Brewer.

External links
 Google Books

1929 German-language novels
Novels by Alfred Döblin
Novels about cities
Novels about German prostitution
Novels set in the 1920s
Novels set in Berlin
Futurist literature
Modernist novels
Weimar culture
German novels adapted into films
German novels adapted into television shows
Works about criminals
S. Fischer Verlag books
1929 German novels